Jamestown Historic District may refer to:

Jamestown Historic District (Jamestown, North Carolina), listed on the National Register of Historic Places in Guilford County, North Carolina
Jamestown Historic District (Jamestown, North Dakota), listed on the National Register of Historic Places in Stutsman County, North Dakota
Jamestown Historic District (Florence, South Carolina), listed on the National Register of Historic Places in Florence County, South Carolina